Va'a, also called the outrigger canoe, for the 2005 South Pacific Mini Games was held from 29 July to 3 August 2005 at Koror, Palau. Tahiti did not compete at this regatta, and New Caledonia topped the medal count.

Medal summary

Medal table

Men's Results

Women's Results

References

Outrigger canoeing at the Pacific Games
2005 South Pacific Mini Games
Pacific Mini Games
2005 in Palau
Sports in Palau